Acquato Lake is a lake at Capalbio in the Province of Grosseto, Tuscany, Italy.

Lakes of Tuscany

Capalbio